Injikollai is a village in the Kumbakonam taluk of Thanjavur district, Tamil Nadu, India.

Demographics 

As per the 2001 census, Injikollai had a total population of 3631 with 1813 males and 1818 females. The sex ratio was 1003. The literacy rate was 74.28.

References 

 

Villages in Thanjavur district